Richard Henry Stevens (9 April 1893 – 12 February 1967) was a major in the British Indian Army and from 1939 Head of the Passport Control Office (PCO) of the British Secret Intelligence Service in the Netherlands. His name is closely associated with the Venlo Incident in 1939.

Background and earlier life

Stevens mastered Arabic, Hindustani, and Malay, and until 1939 worked as an Intelligence Officer in India. That year he was transferred to Europe and put in charge of the SIS station in The Hague. His second language was Greek and he also spoke excellent German, French and Russian but he had no specific training or experience of intelligence gathering in Europe.

Abduction at the Venlo Incident

In November 1939 he was abducted to Germany in the Venlo Incident with Captain Sigismund Payne Best. It has been suggested that he may then have revealed vital secrets about the Secret Intelligence Service under interrogation. In any event, the inexperienced Stevens was carrying on his person a plain-text list of SIS agents when he was abducted.

The two officers were imprisoned for over five years in Sachsenhausen and Dachau concentration camps before their release in April 1945. Nazi propaganda portrayed Best and Stevens as the alleged masterminds of the Beer Hall attempt to assassinate Adolf Hitler by Georg Elser.

Later life

Stevens retired from the Indian army as a lieutenant-colonel on the 26 February 1946, having been promoted to that rank during his captivity. He then worked as a translator at NATO in Paris and London between 1951 and 1952. He died of cancer in 1967.

See also
 Sigismund Payne Best#Second World War intelligence work

Notes

References
Best, Sigismund Payne : The Venlo Incident, London 1950
Brown, Anthony Cave: Bodyguard of Lies, New York 1975 (Deutsch: Die unsichtbare Front, München 1976) (German: The invisible front, Munich 1976)
Deac, Wil: "The Venlo Sting", World War II Magazine 1/1997, New York 1997
Deacon, Richard/West, Nigel: Spy!, London 1980
Haag 1949 Enquêtecommissie Regeringsbeleid 1940-1945, 8 parts of 1949–56, Part 2 a, b, c, The Hague 1949
Graaff, Bob de: The Venlo Incident, World War Investigator 13/1990, London 1990
Kessler, Leo: Betrayal at Venlo, London 1991
Nater, Johan P.: Het Venlo incident, Rotterdam 1984
Peis, Günter : The Man Who Started The War, London 1960
Posthumus Meyjes, Herman C.: De Enquêtecommissie is van oordeel - een Samenvatting van het onderzoek naar het parlementaire de regeringsbeleid in oorloogsjaren, Arnhem / Amsterdam 1958
Schellenberg, Walter: The Schellenberg Memoirs, London 1956 (German Records, Munich 1979)

1893 births
1967 deaths
World War II espionage
Secret Intelligence Service personnel
British Indian Army officers
Sachsenhausen concentration camp survivors
Dachau concentration camp survivors
British World War II prisoners of war
World War II prisoners of war held by Germany
Indian Army personnel of World War I
Indian Army personnel of World War II